Dumchevo is a rural locality (a selo) and the administrative center of Dumchevsky Selsoviet, Zalesovsky District, Altai Krai, Russia. The population was 612 as of 2013. There are 9 streets.

Geography 
Dumchevo is located 33 km west of Zalesovo (the district's administrative centre) by road. Nogino is the nearest rural locality.

References 

Rural localities in Zalesovsky District